Lieutenant General Leonīds Kalniņš (born February 13, 1957, in Tomsk Oblast, RSFSR, Soviet Union) is a Latvian politician and general. He currently serves as the Commander of the Joint Headquarters. He was born in 1957 in the Russian Pervomaysky District and attended the Dobele R. Eihes Secondary School (now the Dobele State Gymnasium) in his youth. After graduating in 1975, he began his service in the Soviet Armed Forces, attending the Vilnius Higher Airborne Defense School. In 1990 he graduated from the Kharkov Military Academy in Ukraine. In 1997, he began his service in an infantry battalion in the Latvian National Armed Forces. His first official position he took was as the Chief of the Operational Planning Board of the Latvian National Guard Headquarters. In 2006, Kalniņš was appointed as deputy commander of the Latvian Contingent in Iraq. Between 2010 and 2013, he studied at the Baltic Defence College in Estonia and the United States Army Command and General Staff College in Kansas. In November 2016, he was promoted to the post of Commander of the Joint Headquarters of the NAF and was confirmed by the Saeima at the end of the year. He began his duties as NAF Commander on January 27, 2017. He is a recipient of the Order of Viesturs.

References

1957 births
Living people
People from Tomsk Oblast
Latvian generals